The 1882 season was to be the last for the Troy Trojans. The team finished at 35–48, in seventh place in the National League, and were disbanded after the season.

Regular season

Season standings

Record vs. opponents

Roster

Player stats

Batting

Starters by position
Note: Pos = Position; G = Games played; AB = At bats; H = Hits; Avg. = Batting average; HR = Home runs; RBI = Runs batted in

Other batters
Note: G = Games played; AB = At bats; H = Hits; Avg. = Batting average; HR = Home runs; RBI = Runs batted in

Pitching

Starting pitchers
Note: G = Games pitched; IP = Innings pitched; W = Wins; L = Losses; ERA = Earned run average; SO = Strikeouts

Relief pitchers
Note: G = Games pitched; W = Wins; L = Losses; SV = Saves; ERA = Earned run average; SO = Strikeouts

References
1882 Troy Trojans season at Baseball Reference

Troy Trojans (MLB team) seasons
Troy Trojans season
Troy Trojans